Blackborough Priory was a Benedictine monastic house in Norfolk, England, about 5 miles or 8 km south east of King's Lynn. The Ordnance Survey map shows the remains of fishponds nearby, which may have been for the use of the monastery.

History 
The priory was founded in 1150 by Roger de Scales and his wife Muriel, and was intended for the use of monks. Later, both nuns and monks were allowed in the priory. By 1200 the priory was dedicated for the sole use of Benedictine nuns. The nunnery operated until the Dissolution of the Monasteries in 1537. Between 1200 and 1537 the priory had nineteen prioresses. The first was Avelina and the last was Elizabeth Dawney. Today, the site of the priory is a cattle farm.

Burials
Robert Scales, 1st Baron Scales and his wife Isabell de Burnell de Scales
Robert Scales, 3rd Baron Scales
Roger Scales, 4th Baron Scales
Robert Scales, 5th Baron Scales

See also
List of monastic houses in Norfolk

References

Monasteries in Norfolk
Benedictine monasteries in England